Austroaeschna pulchra is a species of large dragonfly in the family Telephlebiidae, 
known as the forest darner. 
It inhabits streams and rivers in eastern Australia, from around Brisbane through to Victoria.

The male Austroaeschna pulchra is a brown to black dragonfly with yellow, green or blue markings; while the female is brown with yellow markings. They appear similar to the Carnarvon darner, Austroaeschna muelleri.

Gallery

See also
 List of dragonflies of Australia

References

Telephlebiidae
Odonata of Australia
Endemic fauna of Australia
Taxa named by Robert John Tillyard
Insects described in 1909